The New Historians (HaHistoryonim HaChadashim) are a loosely defined group of Israeli historians who have challenged traditional versions of Israeli history, including Israel's role in the 1948 Palestinian exodus and Arab willingness to discuss peace. The term was coined in 1988 by Benny Morris, one of the leading New Historians. According to Ethan Bronner of The New York Times, the New Historians have sought to advance the peace process in the region.

Much of the primary source material used by the group comes from Israeli government papers that were newly available as a result of being declassified thirty years after the founding of Israel. The perception of a new historiographical current emerged with the publications of four scholars in the 1980s:  Benny Morris, Ilan Pappé, Avi Shlaim and Simha Flapan. Subsequently, many other historians and historical sociologists, among them Tom Segev, Hillel Cohen, Baruch Kimmerling, Joel Migdal, Idith Zertal and Shlomo Sand have been identified with the movement.

Initially dismissed by the public, the New Historians eventually gained legitimacy in Israel in the 1990s. Some of their conclusions have been incorporated into the political ideology of post-Zionists.

Main arguments
Avi Shlaim described the New Historians' differences from what he termed the "official history" in the following terms:

The official version said that Britain tried to prevent the establishment of a Jewish state; the New Historians claimed that it tried to prevent the establishment of a Palestinian state
The official version said that the Palestinians fled their homes of their own free will; the New Historians said that the refugees were chased out or expelled
The official version said that the balance of power was in favour of the Arabs; the New Historians said that Israel had the advantage both in manpower and in arms
The official version said that the Arabs had a coordinated plan to destroy Israel; the New Historians said that the Arabs were divided
The official version said that Arab intransigence prevented peace; the New Historians said that Israel is primarily to blame for the "dead end".

Pappé suggests that the Zionist leaders intended to displace most Palestinian Arabs; Morris believes the displacement happened in the heat of war. According to the New Historians, Israel and Arab countries each have their share of responsibility for the Arab–Israeli conflict and the Palestinian plight.

Influence on traditional Israeli historical narrative and public opinion
Michal Ben-Josef Hirsch argues that, prior to the advent of the New Historians, "Israelis held to a one-sided historical narrative of the circumstances leading to the creation of the Palestinian refugee problem, and that any other counter-narratives were taboo." According to Ben-Josef Hirsch, the conclusions of the New Historians, and the wide-ranging debate that they provoked, ended that taboo and changed the way in which the Palestinian refugee problem and its causes were viewed in Israel. Ben-Josef Hirsch says that the traditional Israeli narrative, that Arabs were responsible for the exodus of the Palestinians, held from 1948 to the late 1990s. She says that the arguments of the New Historians significantly challenged that narrative, leading to a broad debate both in academia and in the wider public discourse, including journalists and columnists, politicians, public figures, and the general public.

Ben-Josef Hirsch believes that a significant change has occurred in how the Palestinian refugee issue is viewed in Israeli society since the late 1990s, with a more complex narrative being more accepted; it recognizes there were instances where Israeli forces expelled Palestinians with the knowledge and authorization of the Israeli leadership. Ben-Josef Hirsch attributes that change to the work of the New Historians and the resulting debate.

The New Historians gained respect by the 1990s. A 1998 series on state television marking Israel's 50th anniversary drew much from their work, as did textbooks introduced to ninth graders in 1999.

Critics of the New Historians have acknowledged this shift. Avi Beker, writing in the Jerusalem Post, states that the effect of the New Historians work on the history of the Arab–Israeli conflict "cannot be exaggerated". He says the work of the New Historians is now the mainstream in academia, and that their influence was not confined to intellectual circles. To illustrate his point he cites examples from changes to Israeli school text books to the actions of Israeli political leaders and developments in the Israeli–Palestinian peace process.

Criticism 

The writings of the New Historians have come under repeated criticism, both from traditional Israeli historians who accuse them of fabricating Zionist misdeeds, and from Arab or pro-Arab writers who accuse them of whitewashing the truth about Zionist misbehaviour.  Efraim Karsh has accused them of ignoring questions which he says are critical: Who started the war? What were their intentions? Who was forced to mount a defence? What were Israel's casualties?

Early in 2002, the most famous of the new historians, Benny Morris, publicly reversed some of his personal political positions, though he has not withdrawn any of his historical writings. Morris says he did not use much of the newly available archival material when he wrote his book: "When writing The Birth of the Palestinian Refugee Problem 1947–1949 in the mid-1980s, I had no access to the materials in the IDFA [IDF Archive] or the Haganah Archive and precious little to first-hand military materials deposited elsewhere."

Anita Shapira offers the following criticism:

Israeli historian Yoav Gelber criticized New Historians in an interview, saying that aside from Benny Morris, they did not contribute to the research of the 1948 Arab–Israeli War in any way. He did however note that they contributed to the public discourse about the war.

Post-Zionism

Some commentators have argued that the historiography of the New Historians has both drawn inspiration from, and lent impetus to, a movement known as post-Zionism. Generally the term "post-Zionist" is self-identified by Jewish Israelis who are critical of the Zionist enterprise and are seen by Zionists as undermining the Israeli national ethos. Post-Zionists differ from Zionists on many important details, such as the status of the law of return and other sensitive issues. Post-Zionists view the Palestinian dispossession as central to the creation of the state of Israel. 

Baruch Kimmerling criticised the focus on "post-Zionism", arguing that debates around the term were "nonsense and semi-professional and
mainly political". According to Kimmerling the term has been arbitrarily applied to any research on Israeli history, society or politics that was critical or perceived to be critical. Kimmerling saw this discussion as damaging to research in these areas because it took the focus away from the quality and merit of scholarship and onto whether the work should be characterized as Zionist or post-Zionist. Further, Kimmerling asserted that academics were diverted away from serious research onto polemical issues and that the environment this fostered inhibited the research of younger academics who were fearful of being labeled as belonging to one of the two camps.

Benny Morris
The "Old Historians" lived through 1948 as highly committed adult participants in the epic, glorious rebirth of the Jewish commonwealth. They were unable to separate their lives from this historical event, unable to regard impartially and objectively the facts and processes that they later wrote about.
The "Old Historians" have written largely on the basis of interviews and memoirs and at best made use of select batches of documents, many of them censored.
Benny Morris has been critical of the old Historians, describing them, by and large, as not really historians, who did not produce real history: "In reality there were chroniclers and often apologetic", and refers to those who produced it as "less candid", "deceitful" and "misleading".

Major debates 
On a few occasions there have been heated public debates between the New Historians and their detractors. The most notable:

 Benny Morris and Avi Shlaim versus Shabtai Teveth Teveth is best known as a biographer of David Ben-Gurion. Teveth: Middle Eastern Studies, Vol. 26 (1990) 214–249; Morris: 1948 and After; Teveth: Commentary; Morris and Shlaim: Tikkun.
 Benny Morris versus Norman Finkelstein and Nur MasalhaThis took place in three articles in the Journal of Palestine Studies Vol. 21, No. 1, Autumn, 1991. While acknowledging that Morris had brought to light a vast quantity of previously unknown archival material, Finkelstein and Masalha accused Morris of presenting the evidence with a pro-Zionist spin. Finkelstein wrote "Morris has substituted a new myth, one of the "happy medium" for the old. ... [T]he evidence that Morris adduces does not support his temperate conclusions. ...[S]pecifically, Morris's central thesis that the Arab refugee problem was "born of war, not by design" is belied by his own evidence which shows that Palestine's Arabs were expelled systematically and with premeditation." Masalha accused Morris of treating the issue as "a debate amongst Zionists which has little to do with the Palestinians themselves", and of ignoring the long history that the idea of "transfer" (removal of the Palestinians) had among Zionist leaders. In his response, Morris accused Finkelstein and Masalha of "outworn preconceptions and prejudices" and reiterated his support for a multifaceted explanation for the Arab flight.
 Benny Morris, Avi Shlaim and Ilan Pappé versus Efraim Karsh Efraim Karsh of King's College, London, is a founding editor of Israel Affairs. Starting with an article in the magazine Middle East Quarterly, Karsh alleged that the new historians "systematically distort the archival evidence to invent an Israeli history in an image of their own making". Karsh also provides a list of examples where, he claims, the new historians "truncated, twisted, and distorted" primary documents. Shlaim's reply defended his analysis of the Zionist-Hashemite negotiations prior to 1948. Morris declined immediate reply, accusing Karsh of a "mélange of distortions, half-truths, and plain lies", but published a lengthy rebuttal in the Winter 1998 issue of the Journal of Palestine Studies. Morris replied to many of Karsh's detailed accusations, but also returned Karsh's personal invective, going so far as to compare Karsh's work to that of Holocaust deniers. Karsh also published a review on an article of Morris, charging him with "deep-rooted and pervasive distortions". Karsh systematically rejects the methodology of new historians such as Morris in his book Fabricating Israeli History: The 'New Historians' (Israeli History, Politics and Society) (2000).
 Teddy Katz versus Alexandroni Brigade In 1998, Teddy Katz interviewed and taped Israeli and Palestinian witnesses to events at Tantura in 1948 and wrote a master's thesis at Haifa University claiming that the Alexandroni Brigade committed a massacre in the Arab village of Tantura during the 1948 Arab-Israeli war. The veterans of the brigade sued Katz for libel. During the court hearing Katz conceded by issuing a statement retracting his own work. He then tried to retract his retraction, but the court disallowed it and ruled against him. He appealed to the Supreme Court but it declined to intervene. Meanwhile, a committee at Haifa University claimed to have found serious problems with the thesis, including "quotations" that were contradicted by Katz's taped records of interview. The university suspended his degree and asked him to resubmit his thesis. The new thesis was given a "second-class" pass. The Tantura debate remains heated, with Ilan Pappé continuing to support allegations of a massacre.

See also

Historiography
Historical revisionism
History wars (comparable Australian phenomenon)

Notes

References
Efraim Karsh, Rewriting Israel's History, Middle East Quarterly, June 1996, Volume 3, Number 2.
Efraim Karsh, Benny Morris and the Reign of Error, Middle East Quarterly, March 1999, Volume 6, Number 1.
Efraim Karsh, "Resurrecting the Myth: Benny Morris, the Zionist Movement, and the 'Transfer' Idea", Israel Affairs, Vol. 11, No. 3 (July 2005), pp. 469–490.
Benny Morris, Peace? No chance, The Guardian, 21 February 2002.
Benny Morris, Undeserving of a Reply Middle East Quarterly, September 1996, Volume 3, Number 3.
David Ratner, PA paid legal defense fees of 1948 Tantura affair historian, Haaretz online, article undated, retrieved 25 February 2005.
Anita Shapira, The Past is not a Foreign Country, The New Republic, 29 November 1999.
Avi Shlaim, A Totalitarian Concept of History, Middle East Quarterly, September 1996, Volume 3, Number 3.

Further reading
 The Jewish Past Revisited: Reflections on Modern Jewish Historians, co-edited by David N. Myers and David B. Ruderman .
 Fabricating Israeli history: The 'New Historians', Efraim Karsh, .
 Refabricating 1948, Benny Morris, Journal of Palestine Studies, Vol 27, Issue 2 (Winter 1998), 81–95. (Morris' rebuttal to Karsh.)
 The making of the Arab-Israeli conflict, 1947–1951, Ilan Pappé (1994), .
 The Ethnic Cleansing of Palestine, Ilan Pappé, Oneworld, Oxford: 2006 
 Benny Morris, 1948, Yale University Press, 2008, 
 The War for Palestine: Rewriting the History of 1948, co-edited by Eugene Rogan and Avi Shlaim
 Nur Masalha, 'New History, Post-Zionism and Neo-Colonialism: A Critique of the Israeli 'New Historians'’, Holy Land Studies: A Multidisciplinary Journal, Vol.10, No.1 (May 2011): 1-53. .  http://www.euppublishing.com/doi/abs/10.3366/hls.2011.0002
Expulsion of the Palestinians: The Concept of "Transfer" in Zionist Political Thought, 1882–1948, by Nur Masalha. Washington DC, IPS, 1992, 
 The Palestine Nakba: Decolonising History, Narrating the Subaltern, Reclaiming Memory, by Nur Masalha. London: Zed Books, 2012,

External links
Avi Shlaim, The War of the Israeli Historians
Angela French, Reexamining Israel's History, Mitzpeh, May 2002.
A critical Palestinian perspective
Jerome Slater, What Went Wrong? The Collapse of the Israeli-Palestinian Peace Process, Political Science Quarterly, Volume 116, Number 2, Summer 2001.
Daniel Polisar, Editorial: "Making History", Azure, Azure Spring 5760 / 2000; editorial is dated 1 February 2000.

 
Arab–Israeli conflict
Zionism
Post-Zionism